Solid cell nests, often abbreviated as SCN, also known as solid cell rests, are specific groups of cells found in the thyroid gland of babies. Typically they are a fraction of a millimeter in size but can rarely become larger. They are considered to be the remains of the ultimobranchial body that exists in early development.

References

Pathology